A Glimpse Inside the Mind of Charles Swan III is a 2012 American comedy film written, directed, and produced by Roman Coppola. It stars Charlie Sheen, Jason Schwartzman, Bill Murray, Katheryn Winnick and Patricia Arquette.

It premiered at the 2012 Rome Film Festival and had a limited release on February 8, 2013 in the United States, being the first release under the independent distributor, A24. Since its release, it has garnered a largely negative reception.

Plot
In the 1970s, successful graphic designer and ladies' man Charles Swan III (Sheen) is dumped by his girlfriend Ivana (Winnick), and it throws his life into a tailspin. He does not know whether he loves her or hates her or wants her back or never wants to see her again. Along with his best friend, Kirby (Schwartzman) and his manager, Saul (Murray), Charles starts to suffer from nightmares, fever dreams of past relationships and hits rock bottom as he tries to recover from the recent breakup and tries to turn his life around.

Cast
Charlie Sheen as Charles Swan III
Jason Schwartzman as Kirby Star
Bill Murray as Saul
Katheryn Winnick as Ivana
Patricia Arquette as Izzy, Charles' sister
Aubrey Plaza as Marnie
Mary Elizabeth Winstead as Kate
Dermot Mulroney as Doctor 
Richard Edson as Sanchez
Stephen Dorff as Stephen
C.C. Sheffield as Secretary
Angela Lindvall as Veiled Woman
Tyne Stecklein as Penny 
Lindsey McLevis as Lindsey 
Lexy Hulme as Yvonne
Fabianne Therese as Kirby Star's Girlfriend
Bar Paly as Maria Carla
Margarita Kallas as Josephine
Maxine Bahns as Mom
Alim Kouliev as Russian Cabbie
Liam Hayes as Himself

Production

Roman Coppola began development on the film in 2004.

Filmed on location in Santa Clarita and Los Angeles, California.

Music

"It was surreal", says the Chicago composer and performer Liam Hayes, about appearing in the Roman Coppola film A Glimpse Inside the Mind of Charles Swan III. "I haven't played many gigs on a beach with a Hammond organ, you know?" Hayes, who has made music under the name Plush since the early 1990s, was contacted by Coppola after the director became a huge fan. "I just got so absorbed by his music", Coppola told GQ (UK) about Hayes and Plush.

The result of this appreciation was Hayes and Coppola making a soundtrack out of Hayes' music. "It evolved", says Hayes. "When we met to discuss the project we talked about possible songs. We talked some more, added a few more songs, and I ended up doing the score." Hayes also appears in the film performing the tune "So Much Music". It is not his first time onscreen: In 2000 he appeared in High Fidelity performing his song "Soaring and Boring".

Release

First premiered at the Rome Film Festival in November 2012. 

On January 8, 2013, the film was released through video on demand and was released in a limited release in the United States on February 8, 2013.

Home media
It was released on Blu-ray and DVD on May 14, 2013 in North America.

Reception

Critical response
A Glimpse Inside the Mind of Charles Swan III received an overwhelmingly negative response from critics. Nathan Rabin of The A.V. Club gave the movie an F, saying that "it isn't a movie so much as a feature-length perfume commercial for a Charlie Sheen signature cologne with gorgeous packaging and absolutely nothing inside." The Dallas Observer said that the film "might generously be described as cut-and-paste – or more accurately as 'throw stuff to the wall and see what sticks'" and it was "a clunker". The New York Daily News gave Charles Swan III one star out of five, saying that "you want to swat it away" and that "maybe with this out of his [Coppola's] system, he'll think up something better." Time said that the film "does not lead to a deeper understanding of Charlie Sheen. It does, however, demonstrate his compulsion for poor judgment and bad choices. But weren't we already convinced of that?"

Lisa Schwarzbaum, reviewer for Entertainment Weekly, gave the film a C and a milder response, writing, "The idea of this home-movie-with-higher-production-values directed by Roman Coppola is no less sweet for being unoriginal ... The execution, on the other hand, is perilously self-absorbed, a private party involving friends, family, too many fantasy sequences, and an abundance of costume and set design to create a notion of a stylized L.A. spritzed with eau de Playboy."

The film holds a 16% "rotten" rating on Rotten Tomatoes, based on 56 reviews. The site's consensus reads: "Tiresomely self-indulgent and lacking any storytelling cohesion, this Glimpse Inside the Mind finds little food for thought." Metacritic gave the film a 28/100 "generally unfavorable" approval rating based on 22 reviews.

Box office 
The film opened at #64 with US$12,000 in its limited release at two theaters the week of February 8. The following weekend, the weekend of February 15, Charles Swan III expanded to 18 theaters and gained an 81.6% increase. As of July 11, 2013, the domestic total of A Glimpse Inside the Mind of Charles Swan III is US$45,350, and in Russia the film has grossed $134,473, with an additional $26,999 in Mexico.

References

External links
 

Films directed by Roman Coppola
2012 comedy films
Films shot in Los Angeles
Films set in the 1970s
2012 films
Films with screenplays by Roman Coppola
A24 (company) films
American comedy films
American Zoetrope films
Films scored by Roger Neill
2010s English-language films
2010s American films